Chris Foote may refer to:

 Christopher Spencer Foote (1935–2005), American chemist
 Chris Foote (American football) (born 1956), American football player 
 Chris Foote (footballer) (born 1950), English footballer